Nicolás Javier Schiappacasse Oliva (born 12 January 1999) is a Uruguayan professional footballer who plays as a forward for Miramar Misiones.

Club career

River Plate Montevideo
Born in Montevideo, Schiappacasse joined River Plate Montevideo's youth setup in 2014 at the age of 11, from Club Universal. On 5 January 2015, aged only 15, he started training with the first-team.

On 19 April 2015, already sold to Atlético Madrid, Schiappacasse made his main squad – and Primera División – debut, coming on as a late substitute for Santiago García in a 2–0 home win against Juventud. He scored his first professional goal on 23 May, netting his team's third in a 4–0 home routing of El Tanque Sisley.

Atlético Madrid
In July 2016, aged 17, Schiappacasse was a part of Atlético Madrid's pre-season under Diego Simeone. He was subsequently assigned to the Juvenil A squad, thus returning to youth football.

Schiappacasse made his debut for Atleti's B-team on 11 September 2016, replacing Caio Henrique and scoring his team's second in a 2–3 away loss against AD Unión Adarve in the Tercera División. He contributed with three goals in 14 appearances for the reserves, achieving promotion to the Segunda División B.

For the 2017–18 season, Schiappacasse only featured rarely for the B-side.

Rayo Majadahonda (loan)
On 7 August 2018, Schiappacasse was loaned to CF Rayo Majadahonda of the Segunda División for a year.

Parma (loan)
On 31 January 2019, Schiappacasse signed for Serie A club Parma on loan until 30 June 2020.

Famalicão (loan)
On 18 July 2019, newly promoted Portuguese Primeira Liga side Famalicão announced the signing of Schiappacasse on a season-long loan deal.

Sassuolo
On 5 October 2020, Italian Serie A club Sassuolo announced the signing of Schiappacasse on a permanent basis.

Peñarol (loan)
On 30 March 2021, Schiappacasse returned to Uruguay after agreeing to a season-long loan deal with Peñarol.

International career
Schiappacasse is a former Uruguay youth international. He has amassed 80 caps and 35 goals for different youth teams of Uruguay over six years. He was part of the Uruguay squad at the 2013 South American U-15 Championship, 2015 South American U-17 Championship, 2017 South American U-20 Championship, 2017 FIFA U-20 World Cup, 2019 South American U-20 Championship and 2019 FIFA U-20 World Cup.

With 21 goals, Schiappacasse is the all-time top scorer of the Uruguay under-20 team. He is also second in number of matches played for the under-20 team, only behind Rodrigo Amaral. He also used to be joint all-time top scorer of the Uruguay under-17 team along with Franco Acosta, a feat which was surpassed by Facundo Torres in 2017.

Personal life 
He is of Italian descent, and holds an Italian passport.

In September 2020 he tested positive for COVID-19.

On 26 January 2022 he was arrested by police in Uruguay for carrying a concealed firearm on his way to a derby between Club Nacional de Football and Club Atlético Peñarol. He stated he was going to deliver it to a Peñarol hooligan.

References

External links

1999 births
Living people
Footballers from Montevideo
Uruguayan sportspeople of Italian descent
Association football forwards
Uruguayan footballers
Uruguayan Primera División players
Club Atlético River Plate (Montevideo) players
Segunda División B players
Tercera División players
Serie A players
Atlético Madrid B players
CF Rayo Majadahonda players
Parma Calcio 1913 players
F.C. Famalicão players
U.S. Sassuolo Calcio players
Peñarol players
Miramar Misiones players
Uruguay under-20 international footballers
Uruguay youth international footballers
Uruguayan expatriate footballers
Uruguayan expatriate sportspeople in Spain
Uruguayan expatriate sportspeople in Italy
Expatriate footballers in Spain
Expatriate footballers in Italy
Expatriate footballers in Portugal
Citizens of Italy through descent